Dmitry Vladimirovich Kulikov (born 29 October 1990) is a Russian professional ice hockey defenceman for the Pittsburgh Penguins of the National Hockey League (NHL). He was drafted by the Florida Panthers in the first round, 14th overall, at the 2009 NHL Entry Draft. He has previously played for the Panthers, Buffalo Sabres, Winnipeg Jets, New Jersey Devils, Edmonton Oilers, Minnesota Wild, and Anaheim Ducks.

Playing career

Junior
Kulikov began his career in his homeland Russia with Lokomotiv-2 Yaroslavl in the Pervaya Liga, and left his club in November 2008 to sign for the Drummondville Voltigeurs of the Quebec Major Junior Hockey League (QMJHL) in North America. In his lone season with Drummondville, Kulikov led all QMJHL defencemen with 62 points in 57 games, and took home a slew of post-season awards, including the Emile Bouchard Trophy as the QMJHL Defenceman of the Year, the Raymond Lagacé Trophy as the Defensive Rookie of the Year and the Mike Bossy Trophy as the League's top professional prospect.

Professional
After his rookie year with the Voltigeurs, Kulikov was drafted by the Florida Panthers 14th overall in the 2009 NHL Entry Draft, and was later signed to a professional contract the club on 29 September 2009.

Despite his age, Kulikov managed to play in 68 games with Florida in his rookie season, 2009–10, displaying high levels of skill and confidence. Panthers General Manager Dale Tallon expressed that the Panthers organization had high expectations of Kulikov for the future.

On 18 July 2014, Kulikov signed a three-year, $13 million contract extension with the Panthers, worth $4.3 million annually.

On 25 June 2016, Kulikov was traded to the Buffalo Sabres, along with the 33rd overall pick in the 2016 NHL Draft in exchange for defenceman Mark Pysyk and picks 38 and 89 in the 2016 draft. In the 2016–17 season, Kulikov's time with the Sabres was largely affected through injury. In the last year of his contract, he appeared in 47 games to produce a career low 2 goals and 5 points.

On 1 July 2017, as a free agent from his disappointing tenure with the Sabres, Kulikov was signed to a three-year, $12 million contract with the Winnipeg Jets.

After the completion of his contract with the Jets, Kulikov left as a free agent and on 22 October 2020, he was signed to a one-year, $1.15 million contract with the New Jersey Devils. In the pandemic delayed 2020–21 season, Kulikov brought a sound defensive game to the Devils, registering 2 assists through 38 regular season games. With the Devils out of playoff contention, Kulikov was dealt at the trade deadline to the Edmonton Oilers in exchange for a conditional fourth-round selection in 2022 on 12 April 2021.

At the conclusion of his contract with the Oilers, Kulikov left as a free agent and on 28 July 2021, was signed to a two-year, $4.5 million contract with the Minnesota Wild.

After one season with the Wild, Kulikov was traded to the Anaheim Ducks for future considerations on 31 August 2022.

On 3 March 2023, the Ducks traded Kulikov to the Pittsburgh Penguins in exchange for Brock McGinn and a third-round pick in the 2024 NHL Entry Draft.

International play

Kulikov represented Russia in two Under-18 World Cups: 2007 in Finland and 2008 in Russia. He was then a member of Team Russia at the 2009 World Junior Ice Hockey Championships.

Career statistics

Regular season and playoffs

International

References

External links
 

1990 births
Living people
Anaheim Ducks players
Buffalo Sabres players
Drummondville Voltigeurs players
Edmonton Oilers players
Florida Panthers draft picks
Florida Panthers players
Lokomotiv Yaroslavl players
Minnesota Wild players
National Hockey League first-round draft picks
New Jersey Devils players
Pittsburgh Penguins players
Russian expatriate ice hockey people
Russian expatriate sportspeople in the United States
Russian ice hockey defencemen
Sportspeople from Lipetsk
Winnipeg Jets players